Fanthorp Inn State Historic Site is a historic hotel in Anderson, Texas. The Texas Parks and Wildlife Department acquired the  site by purchase in 1977 from a Fanthorp descendant. Ten years were spent researching and restoring the Inn to its 1850 look. The site was opened to the public on October 4, 1987.

The clapboard-covered log house was built in 1834 by an English immigrant, Henry Fanthorp, as a home for his third wife, Rachel Kennard. He bought  and built his house in 1834 along the road that crossed his land. The building was enlarged in about 1850 to accommodate its usage as a hotel and store.

Henry Fanthorp was appointed postmaster by the Provisional Texas Government in 1835. The building was the first post office in the region. Fanthorp Inn became a well-known stopping place for stagecoaches, travelers, and the community.

On July 3, 1845, Kenneth Lewis Anderson, vice-president of the Republic of Texas died from illness at the Inn while en route home from Washington-on-the-Brazos.

On September 1, 2019, Fanthorp Inn State Historic Site was transferred from the Texas Parks and Wildlife Department to the Texas Historical Commission.

See also

Log house
National Register of Historic Places listings in Grimes County, Texas
Stagecoach Inn in Bell County, Texas
Stagecoach Inn in Washington County, Texas

References

External links
Fanthorp Inn State Historic Site website

Texas state historic sites
Houses on the National Register of Historic Places in Texas
Protected areas of Grimes County, Texas
Historic house museums in Texas
Museums in Grimes County, Texas
Houses completed in 1834
Log houses in the United States
Houses in Grimes County, Texas
National Register of Historic Places in Grimes County, Texas
Log buildings and structures on the National Register of Historic Places in Texas